Djursholms Sveavägen used to be a railway stop at Djursholmsbanan, a part of Roslagsbanan which was discontinued in 1976. The station was situated at Sveavägen in Djursholm. The place name was added to the street name (with a genitive s) to avoid confusion with Sveavägen in Stockholm.

Station code: Djs

References

Disused railway stations in Sweden
Metropolitan Stockholm
Stockholm urban area
Railway stations closed in 1976